National Highway 752H, commonly referred to as NH 752H is a national highway in  India. It is a spur road of National Highway 52. NH-752H traverses the state of Maharashtra in India.

Route 

Yevla, Andarsul, Vaijapur Rotegaon, Shivur, DevgaonRanagari, Dewashi, Daultabad, Khultabad, Phulambri Dabhadi, Rajur, Deulgaon.

Junctions  
 
  Terminal near Yevla.
  Terminal near Deulgaon.

See also 

 List of National Highways in India
 List of National Highways in India by state

References

External links 

 NH 752H on OpenStreetMap

National highways in India
National Highways in Maharashtra